In English grammar, a right-branching sentence is a sentence in which the main subject of the sentence is described first, and is followed by a sequence of modifiers that provide additional information about the subject. The inverse would be a Left-branching sentence. The name "right-branching" comes from the English syntax of putting such modifiers to the right of the sentence.  For example, the following sentence is right-branching.

The dog slept on the doorstep of the house in which it lived.

Note that the sentence begins with the subject, followed by a verb, and then the object of the verb. This is then followed by a modifier that more closely defines the object, and this modifier is itself modified by a subsequent modifier.

Right-branching sentences are generally held to be easier to read than other similarly-complex grammatical structures in English, perhaps because other branching styles require the listener to hold more information in memory to be able to correctly interpret the sentence.

See also 
 Branching (linguistics)

References 

 
 

English grammar